Petrus du Plessis (born in Hermanus, South Africa, May 31, 1981) is a professional rugby coach and former player, most recently for Glasgow Warriors. He played as a Tighthead Prop and acted as player-coach at the club.

Rugby Union career

Professional career

He joined Saracens in the 2009-10 season from Nottingham.  Whilst at Saracens he helped them win three Premiership titles in 2011, 2015 and 2016. He was a replacement in 2011 but started in both 2015 and 2016. He also helped Saracens win the European Champions Cup in 2016 and 2017.

On 2 June 2017 it was announced du Plessis would be moving to London Irish for the 2017-18 English Premiership season.

He was released from London Irish and signed by Glasgow Warriors on 9 October 2018.

Coaching career

He was made scrum coach of Glasgow Warriors on 3 June 2019. He was signed until 2021 in a deal which also involved playing when required. He departed the club in July 2020.
In September 2020 he was employed by Rugby Australia to become the scrum coach for the Wallabies Rugby team.

Acting career

du Plessis also made his acting debut after appearing in London Fields as Marmaduke's carer alongside Billy Bob Thornton and Theo James. He also joined the cast of Gatwick Gangsters in 2014.

Physiotherapy career

du Plessis is also a qualified physiotherapist and graduated from the University of Salford in 2008.

References

12. https://www.smh.com.au/sport/rugby-union/the-mystery-man-charged-with-turning-wallabies-scrum-into-a-weapon-20201104-p56bgk.html

External links
Saracens Profile

London Irish players
South African rugby union coaches
South African rugby union players
British rugby union players
1981 births
Living people
Saracens F.C. players
Glasgow Warriors players
Lancashire County RFU players
Glasgow Warriors coaches
Liverpool St Helens F.C. players